Ervin Rexha (born 1 November 1991 in Shkodër) is an Albanian professional footballer who currently plays for Amacspor Dahlhausen in the German amateur leagues. He last played professionally for Tërbuni and Besëlidhja in Albania.

References

External links
 Profile - FSHF

1991 births
Living people
Footballers from Shkodër
Albanian footballers
Association football central defenders
KF Vllaznia Shkodër players
KF Laçi players
FK Tomori Berat players
Luftëtari Gjirokastër players
KF Tërbuni Pukë players
Besëlidhja Lezhë players
Kategoria e Parë players
Kategoria Superiore players
Albanian expatriate footballers
Albanian expatriate sportspeople in Germany
Expatriate footballers in Germany